The stibadium (plural: stibadia) is a later form of the Roman lectus triclinaris, the reclining seat used by diners in the triclinium. Originally, the lecti were arranged in a group of three in a semi-circle. The stibadium was a single semi-circular couch, fitting up to a dozen people, which replaced the triple group of lecti in the dining-room, frequently in alcoves around the centre of the room. 

This ancient Roman furniture is also called sigma. This name comes from the lunate sigma (upper case C, lower case ϲ) — which resembles, but which is not at all related to, the Latin letter C and was used in Eastern forms of Greek writing and in the Middle Ages.

The stibadium was originally an outdoor seat but was introduced indoors in the 2nd and 3rd centuries AD because the shape was more convenient for entertaining and as triclinia became larger and more elaborate.

Films about ancient Roman convivia often feature a stibadium rather than a lectus.

See also
 Accubita
 Ancient Roman cuisine
 Klinai

External links 

 Rogue Classicism

Notes

Ancient Roman furniture
History of furniture